The Abilene Trail was a cattle trail leading from Texas to Abilene, Kansas. Its exact route is disputed owing to its many offshoots, but it crossed the Red River just east of Henrietta, Texas, and continued north across the Indian Territory to Caldwell, Kansas and on past Wichita and Newton to Abilene. The first herds were probably driven over it in 1866, though it was not named until Abilene was established in 1867.

In 1867, Joseph G. McCoy of Illinois settled in Abilene to engage in the cattle trade. He laid out a cattle trail to connect with the north end of the Chisholm Trail, near Wichita. It was to run northward to Abilene on the Union Pacific Railroad where the cattle could be marketed in a more expeditious manner. The road from the mouth of the Little Arkansas to Abilene "was not direct but circuitous. In order to straighten up this trail and bring the cattle direct to Abilene, and by shortening the distance, to counteract the exertions of western would-be competing points for the cattle trade, an engineer corps was sent out under the charge of Civil Engineer T. F. Hersey.

Hersey, armed with a compass, flag men, and a detail of laborers with spades and shovels, started out and ran due south from Abilene until the crossing of the Arkansas was reached. There they found good water and abundant grass with suitable camping points throughout the entire distance. With the first drove of cattle of the season, the party piloted the herd over the new trail and across the Arkansas River, thus opening it to the many thousand herds that followed in the months and years afterward."

In 1867 about 35,000 head of cattle were driven from Texas to Abilene over this trail; in 1868 about 75,000; in 1870 about 300,000; and in 1871 about 700,000. This was the largest number ever received from Texas in any one year. The country about Abilene was settling up quickly at this time. Grazing lands were becoming scarcer and these conditions were such that many of the settlers objected to the pasturing of the great herds in the vicinity. In the year 1872, Wichita was in possession of the trade that Abilene had enjoyed for several years prior due to the completion of the Santa Fe railroad. This gave Wichita the needed railroad facilities. From 1867 to 1871 about 10,000 cars of livestock were shipped out of Abilene and in 1872 about 80,000 head of cattle were shipped from Wichita.

The settlement of the valleys of the Arkansas and the Ninnescah rivers rendered it impractical to reach Wichita shipping yards after 1873 and the loading of cattle was transferred to points on the railroad farther west, finally stopping at Dodge City. The use of the Abilene cattle trail ended in 1887.

References 
This article incorporates text from Kansas: a cyclopedia of state history, embracing events, institutions, industries, counties, cities, towns, prominent persons, etc., published in 1912

Historic trails and roads in Texas
Historic trails and roads in Kansas
Trails and roads in the American Old West